Paulo Cunha may refer to:

 Paulo Cunha (businessman) (born 1940), Brazilian executive and businessman
 Paulo Cunha (basketball) (born 1980), Portuguese basketball player
 Paulo Cunha (footballer) (born 1986), Portuguese football player